Monsieur LeClerc is the name of two characters in the television series 'Allo 'Allo!:

Monsieur Roger LeClerc
Monsieur Ernest LeClerc, his brother and successor